WHBX, or 96.1 Jamz, is an urban adult contemporary radio station in the Tallahassee, Florida market owned by Cumulus Licensing, LLC. According to AllAccess.com, WHBX is the highest rated station in the Tallahassee, FL market, joining sister stations Blazin 102.3 and Star 98 as the market's highest rated stations.  Its studios are located in the westside of Tallahassee and its transmitter is based near Wakulla State Forest, south of the city.

History
WMNX signed on in 1981 on 95.9 MHz. By 1982, it was carrying an automated country format. In 1988, the callsign changed to WTMG.

In 1991, WTMG moved up 200 kHz to 96.1, which afforded it a class change from A to C2 and a much stronger signal. The callsign was changed to WHBX to accompany the new facility. Cumulus acquired WBZE and WHBX in 1997 for $15.4 million.

External links

HBX
Radio stations established in 1973
Urban adult contemporary radio stations in the United States
1973 establishments in Florida
Cumulus Media radio stations